P4 may refer to:

Computing
 Intel Pentium 4, a processor series shipped from 2000 to 2008 
 The P4 power connector, introduced in the ATX12V 1.0 standard to power these and later CPUs
 The i486DX (P4) model of the Intel 80486 microprocessor, introduced in 1989
 P4 (programming language), for controlling network data forwarding
 P4, the Perforce software command line client

Media
 P4 Radio Hele Norge (PFI), a Norwegian radio company
 Kanal 24 (Kanal 4), which acquired the Norwegian P4 channel from PFI
 Sveriges Radio P4, a Swedish radio channel
 Persona 4, a 2008 video game
 Periphery IV: Hail Stan, 2019 album by American progressive metal band Periphery

Military
 Skaraborg Regiment (armoured), a Swedish army unit, designated P 4
 Peugeot P4, a French military vehicle

Science
 P4 laboratory, a biosafety level 4 facility
 Tetraphosphorus (P4), an allotrope of phosphorus
 Group p4, the plane symmetry group wallpaper group p4
 Progesterone (Pregn-4-ene-3,20-dione), a steroid hormone
 Kerberos, the fourth moon of Pluto
 Perfect fourth, a musical interval
 Enterobacteria phage P4
 P4, an EEG electrode site according to the 10-20 system
 P4 cell, a stage in the Caenorhabditis elegans embryonic development
 P4-metric, in statistics, a performance metric

Roads
 P4 road (Latvia)
 P04 road (Ukraine)

Other uses
 Papyrus 4, a New Testament manuscript
 Trans-Pacific Strategic Economic Partnership, or P4, a free trade agreement between Brunei, Chile, New Zealand, and Singapore
 Prussian P 4, a German steam locomotive
 Protofour, or P4, a set of standards for model railways

See also
 4P (disambiguation)
 Phosphate, molecular formula PO43−.
 Play (telecommunications) P4, a Polish cellular telecommunications provider